The Sherman Antitrust Act of 1890 is a United States antitrust law which prescribes the rule of free competition among those engaged in commerce. It was passed by Congress and is named for Senator John Sherman, its principal author.

The Sherman Act broadly prohibits 1) anticompetitive agreements and 2) unilateral conduct that monopolizes or attempts to monopolize the relevant market. The Act authorizes the Department of Justice to bring suits to enjoin (i.e. prohibit) conduct violating the Act, and additionally authorizes private parties injured by conduct violating the Act to bring suits for treble damages (i.e. three times as much money in damages as the violation cost them). Over time, the federal courts have developed a body of law under the Sherman Act making certain types of anticompetitive conduct per se illegal, and subjecting other types of conduct to case-by-case analysis regarding whether the conduct unreasonably restrains trade.

The law attempts to prevent the artificial raising of prices by restriction of trade or supply. "Innocent monopoly", or monopoly achieved solely by merit, is legal, but acts by a monopolist to artificially preserve that status, or nefarious dealings to create a monopoly, are not. The purpose of the Sherman Act is not to protect competitors from harm from legitimately successful businesses, nor to prevent businesses from gaining honest profits from consumers, but rather to preserve a competitive marketplace to protect consumers from abuses.

Background
In Spectrum Sports, Inc. v. McQuillan 506 U.S. 447 (1993) the Supreme Court said:

According to its authors, it was not intended to impact market gains obtained by honest means, by benefiting the consumers more than the competitors. Senator George Hoar of Massachusetts, another author of the Sherman Act, said the following:

At Apex Hosiery Co. v. Leader 310 U.S. 469, 310 U. S. 492-93 and n. 15:

At Addyston Pipe and Steel Company v. United States, 85 F.2d 1, affirmed, 175 U. S. 175 U.S. 211;

At Standard Oil Co. of New Jersey v. United States, 221 U. S. 1, 221 U. S. 54-58.

Provisions

Original text
The Sherman Act is divided into three sections. Section 1 delineates and prohibits specific means of anticompetitive conduct, while Section 2 deals with end results that are anti-competitive in nature. Thus, these sections supplement each other in an effort to prevent businesses from violating the spirit of the Act, while technically remaining within the letter of the law. Section 3 simply extends the provisions of Section 1 to U.S. territories and the District of Columbia.

Subsequent legislation expanding its scope

The Clayton Antitrust Act, passed in 1914, proscribes certain additional activities that had been discovered to fall outside the scope of the Sherman Antitrust Act. For example, the Clayton Act added certain practices to the list of impermissible activities:
 price discrimination between different purchasers, if such discrimination tends to create a monopoly
 exclusive dealing agreements
 tying arrangements
 mergers and acquisitions that substantially reduce market competition.

The Robinson–Patman Act of 1936 amended the Clayton Act. The amendment proscribed certain anti-competitive practices in which manufacturers engaged in price discrimination against equally-situated distributors.

Legacy

The federal government began filing cases under the Sherman Antitrust Act in 1890.  Some cases were successful and others were not; many took several years to decide, including appeals.

Notable cases filed under the act include:
 United States v. Workingmen's Amalgamated Council of New Orleans (1893), which was the first to hold that the law applied to labor unions.
 Chesapeake & Ohio Fuel Co. v. United States (1902), in which the trust was dissolved
 Northern Securities Co. v. United States (1904), which reached the Supreme Court, dissolved the company and set many precedents for interpretation.
 Hale v. Henkel (1906) also reached the Supreme Court. Precedent was set for the production of documents by an officer of a company, and the self-incrimination of the officer in his or her testimony to the grand jury. Hale was an officer of the American Tobacco Co.
 Standard Oil Co. of New Jersey v. United States (1911), which broke up the company based on geography, and contributed to the Panic of 1910–11.
 United States v. American Tobacco Co. (1911), which split the company into four.
 United States v. General Electric Co (1911), where GE was judged to have violated the Sherman Anti-Trust Act, along with International General Electric, Philips, Sylvania, Tungsol, and Consolidated and Chicago Miniature. Corning and Westinghouse made consent decrees.
 United States v. Motion Picture Patents Co. (1917), which ruled that the company was abusing its monopolic rights, and therefore, violated the Sherman act.
 Federal Baseball Club v. National League (1922) in which the Supreme Court ruled that Major League Baseball was not interstate commerce and was not subject to the antitrust law.
 United States v. National City Lines (1953), related to the General Motors streetcar conspiracy.
 United States v. AT&T Co., which was settled in 1982 and resulted in the breakup of the company.
Wilk v. American Medical Association (1990) Judge Getzendanner issued her opinion that the AMA had violated Section 1, but not 2, of the Sherman Act, and that it had engaged in an unlawful conspiracy in restraint of trade "to contain and eliminate the chiropractic profession." 
 United States v. Microsoft Corp. was settled in 2001 without the breakup of the company.

Legal application

Constitutional basis for legislation
Congress claimed power to pass the Sherman Act through its constitutional authority to regulate interstate commerce. Therefore, federal courts only have jurisdiction to apply the Act to conduct that restrains or substantially affects either interstate commerce or trade within the District of Columbia. This requires that the plaintiff must show that the conduct occurred during the flow of interstate commerce or had an appreciable effect on some activity that occurs during interstate commerce.

Elements
A Section 1 violation has three elements:
(1) an agreement;
(2) which unreasonably restrains competition; and
(3) which affects interstate commerce.

A Section 2 monopolization violation has two elements:
(1) the possession of monopoly power in the relevant market; and
(2) the willful acquisition or maintenance of that power as distinguished from growth or development as a consequence of a superior product, business acumen, or historic accident.

Section 2 also bans attempted monopolization, which has the following elements:
(1) qualifying exclusionary or anticompetitive acts designed to establish a monopoly
(2) specific intent to monopolize; and
(3) dangerous probability of success (actual monopolization).

Violations "per se" and violations of the "rule of reason"
Violations of the Sherman Act fall (loosely) into two categories:
 Violations "per se": these are violations that meet the strict characterization of Section 1 ("agreements, conspiracies or trusts in restraint of trade"). A per se violation requires no further inquiry into the practice's actual effect on the market or the intentions of those individuals who engaged in the practice. Conduct characterized as per se unlawful is that which has been found to have a "'pernicious effect on competition' or 'lack[s] . . . any redeeming virtue'" Such conduct "would always or almost always tend to restrict competition and decrease output." When a per se rule is applied, a civil violation of the antitrust laws is found merely by proving that the conduct occurred and that it fell within a per se category. (This must be contrasted with rule of reason analysis.) Conduct considered per se unlawful includes horizontal price-fixing, horizontal market division, and concerted refusals to deal.
 Violations of the "rule of reason": A totality of the circumstances test, asking whether the challenged practice promotes or suppresses market competition. Unlike with per se violations, intent and motive are relevant when predicting future consequences. The rule of reason is said to be the "traditional framework of analysis" to determine whether Section 1 is violated. The court analyzes "facts peculiar to the business, the history of the restraining, and the reasons why it was imposed," to determine the effect on competition in the relevant product market. A restraint violates Section 1 if it unreasonably restrains trade.
Quick-look: A "quick look" analysis under the rule of reason may be used when "an observer with even a rudimentary understanding of economics could conclude that the arrangements in question would have an anticompetitive effect on customers and markets," yet the violation is also not one considered illegal per se. Taking a "quick look," economic harm is presumed from the questionable nature of the conduct, and the burden is shifted to the defendant to prove harmlessness or justification. The quick-look became a popular way of disposing of cases where the conduct was in a grey area between illegality "per se" and demonstrable harmfulness under the "rule of reason".

Modern trends

Inference of conspiracy
A modern trend has increased difficulty for antitrust plaintiffs as courts have come to hold plaintiffs to increasing burdens of pleading. Under older Section 1 precedent, it was not settled how much evidence was required to show a conspiracy. For example, a conspiracy could be inferred based on parallel conduct, etc. That is, plaintiffs were only required to show that a conspiracy was conceivable. Since the 1970s, however, courts have held plaintiffs to higher standards, giving antitrust defendants an opportunity to resolve cases in their favor before significant discovery under FRCP 12(b)(6). That is, to overcome a motion to dismiss, plaintiffs, under Bell Atlantic Corp. v. Twombly, must plead facts consistent with FRCP 8(a) sufficient to show that a conspiracy is plausible (and not merely conceivable or possible). This protects defendants from bearing the costs of antitrust "fishing expeditions"; however it deprives plaintiffs of perhaps their only tool to acquire evidence (discovery).

Manipulation of market
Second, courts have employed more sophisticated and principled definitions of markets. Market definition is necessary, in rule of reason cases, for the plaintiff to prove a conspiracy is harmful. It is also necessary for the plaintiff to establish the market relationship between conspirators to prove their conduct is within the per se rule.

In early cases, it was easier for plaintiffs to show market relationship, or dominance, by tailoring market definition, even if it ignored fundamental principles of economics. In U.S. v. Grinnell, 384 U.S. 563 (1966), the trial judge, Charles Wyzanski, composed the market only of alarm companies with services in every state, tailoring out any local competitors; the defendant stood alone in this market, but had the court added up the entire national market, it would have had a much smaller share of the national market for alarm services that the court purportedly used. The appellate courts affirmed this finding; however, today, an appellate court would likely find this definition to be flawed. Modern courts use a more sophisticated market definition that does not permit as manipulative a definition.

Monopoly
Section 2 of the Act forbade monopoly. In Section 2 cases, the court has, again on its own initiative, drawn a distinction between coercive and innocent monopoly. The act is not meant to punish businesses that come to dominate their market passively or on their own merit, only those that intentionally dominate the market through misconduct, which generally consists of conspiratorial conduct of the kind forbidden by Section 1 of the Sherman Act, or Section 3 of the Clayton Act.

Application of the act outside pure commerce
While the Act was aimed at regulating businesses, its prohibition of contracts restricting commerce was applied to the activities of labor unions until the 1930s. This is because unions were characterized as cartels as well (cartels of laborers). In 1914 the Clayton Act created exceptions for certain union activities, but the Supreme Court ruled in Duplex Printing Press Co. v. Deering that the actions allowed by the Act were already legal. Congress included provisions in the Norris–La Guardia Act in 1932 to more explicitly exempt organized labor from antitrust enforcement, and the Supreme Court upheld these exemptions in United States v. Hutcheson 312 U.S. 219.

Preemption by Section 1 of state statutes that restrain competition
To determine whether the Act preempts a state law, courts will engage in a two-step analysis, as set forth by the Supreme Court in Rice v. Norman Williams Co.
First, they will inquire whether the state legislation "mandates or authorizes conduct that necessarily constitutes a violation of the antitrust laws in all cases, or ... places irresistible pressure on a private party to violate the antitrust laws in order to comply with the statute." Rice v. Norman Williams Co., 458 U.S. 654, 661; see also 324 Liquor Corp. v. Duffy, 479 U.S. 335 (1987) ("Our decisions reflect the principle that the federal antitrust laws pre-empt state laws authorizing or compelling private parties to engage in anticompetitive behavior.")
Second, they will consider whether the state statute is saved from preemption by the state action immunity doctrine (aka Parker immunity).  In California Retail Liquor Dealers Ass'n v. Midcal Aluminum, Inc., 445 U.S. 97, 105 (1980), the Supreme Court established a two-part test for applying the doctrine: "First, the challenged restraint must be one clearly articulated and affirmatively expressed as state policy; second, the policy must be actively supervised by the State itself." Id. (citation and quotation marks omitted).

The antitrust laws allow coincident state regulation of competition.   The Supreme Court enunciated the test for determining when a state statute is in irreconcilable conflict with Section 1 of the Sherman Act in Rice v. Norman Williams Co. Different standards apply depending on whether a statute is attacked on its face or for its effects.
A statute can be condemned on its face only when it mandates, authorizes or places irresistible pressure on private parties to engage in conduct constituting a per se violation of Section 1.
If the statute does not mandate conduct violating a per se rule, the conduct is analyzed under the rule of reason, which requires an examination of the conduct's actual effects on competition. If unreasonable anticompetitive effects are created, the required conduct violates Section 1 and the statute is in irreconcilable conflict with the Sherman Act. Then statutory arrangement is analyzed to determine whether it qualifies as "state action" and is thereby saved from preemption.

Rice sets out guidelines to aid in preemption analysis.  Preemption should not occur "simply because in a hypothetical situation a private party's compliance with the statute might cause him to violate the antitrust laws." This language suggests that preemption occurs only if economic analysis determines that the statutory requirements create "an unacceptable and unnecessary risk of anticompetitive effect," and does not occur simply because it is possible to use the statute in an anticompetitive manner. It should not mean that preemption is impossible whenever both procompetitive and anticompetitive results are conceivable. The per se rule "reflects the judgment that such cases are not sufficiently common or important to justify the time and expense necessary to identify them."

Another important, yet, in the context of Rice, ambiguous guideline regarding preemption by Section 1 is the Court's statement that a "state statute is not preempted by the federal antitrust laws simply because the state scheme might have an anticompetitive effect." The meaning of this statement is clarified by examining the three cases cited in Rice to support the statement.

In New Motor Vehicle Board v. Orrin W. Fox Co., automobile manufacturers and retail franchisees contended that the Sherman Act preempted a statute requiring manufacturers to secure the permission of a state board before opening a new dealership if and only if a competing dealer protested. They argued that a conflict existed because the statute permitted "auto dealers to invoke state power for the purpose of restraining intrabrand competition."

In Exxon Corp. v. Governor of Maryland, oil companies challenged a state statute requiring uniform statewide gasoline prices in situations where the Robinson-Patman Act would permit charging different prices. They reasoned that the Robinson-Patman Act is a qualification of our "more basic national policy favoring free competition" and that any state statute altering "the competitive balance that Congress struck between the Robinson-Patman and Sherman Acts" should be preempted.

In both New Motor Vehicle and Exxon, the Court upheld the statutes and rejected the arguments presented as

In this sense, there is a conflict between the statute and the central policy of the Sherman Act – 'our charter of economic liberty'. . . . For if an adverse effect on competition were, in and of itself, enough to render a state statute invalid, the States' power to engage in economic regulation would be effectively destroyed.

This indicates that not every anticompetitive effect warrants preemption.  In neither Exxon nor New Motor Vehicle did the created effect constitute an antitrust violation.  The Rice guideline therefore indicates that only when the effect unreasonably restrains trade, and is therefore a violation, can preemption occur.

The third case cited to support the "anticompetitive effect" guideline is Joseph E. Seagram & Sons v. Hostetter, in which the Court rejected a facial Sherman Act preemption challenge to a statute requiring that persons selling liquor to wholesalers affirm that the price charged was no higher than the lowest price at which sales were made anywhere in the United States during the previous month. Since the attack was a facial one, and the state law required no per se violations, no preemption could occur.  The Court also rejected the possibility of preemption due to Sherman Act violations stemming from misuse of the statute.  The Court stated that rather than imposing "irresistible economic pressure" on sellers to violate the Sherman Act, the statute "appears firmly anchored to the assumption that the Sherman Act will deter any attempts by the appellants to preserve their . . . price level [in one state] by conspiring to raise the prices at which liquor is sold elsewhere in the country." Thus, Seagram indicates that when conduct required by a state statute combines with other conduct that, taken together, constitutes an illegal restraint of trade, liability may be imposed for the restraint without requiring preemption of the state statute.

Rice v. Norman Williams Co. supports this misuse limitation on preemption.  Rice states that while particular conduct or arrangements by private parties would be subject to per se or rule of reason analysis to determine liability, "[t]here is no basis . . . for condemning the statute itself by force of the Sherman Act."

Thus, when a state requires conduct analyzed under the rule of reason, a court must carefully distinguish rule of reason analysis for preemption purposes from the analysis for liability purposes. To analyze whether preemption occurs, the court must determine whether the inevitable effects of a statutory restraint unreasonably restrain trade. If they do, preemption is warranted unless the statute passes the appropriate state action tests. But, when the statutory conduct combines with other practices in a larger conspiracy to restrain trade, or when the statute is used to violate the antitrust laws in a market in which such a use is not compelled by the state statute, the private party might be subjected to antitrust liability without preemption of the statute.

Evidence from legislative history
The Act was not intended to regulate existing state statutes regulating commerce within state borders.  The House committee, in reporting the bill which was adopted without change, declared:
No attempt is made to invade the legislative authority of the several States or even to occupy doubtful grounds. No system of laws can be devised by Congress alone which would effectually protect the people of the  [322  U.S. 533, 575]    United States against the evils and oppression of trusts and monopolies. Congress has no authority to deal, generally, with the subject within the States, and the States have no authority to legislate in respect of commerce between the several States or with foreign nations.

See also the statement on the floor of the House by Mr. Culberson, in charge of the bill,
There is no attempt to exercise any doubtful authority on this subject, but the bill is confined strictly and alone to subjects over which, confessedly, there is no question about the legislative power of Congress. ...

And see the statement of Senator Edmunds, chairman of the Senate Judiciary Committee which reported out the bill in the form in which it passed, that in drafting that bill the committee thought that "we would frame a bill that should be clearly within our constitutional power, that we would make its definition out of terms that were well known to the law already, and would leave it to the courts in the first instance to say how far they could carry it or its particular definitions as applicable to each particular case as the occasion might arise."

Similarly Senator Hoar, a member of that committee who with Senator Edmunds was in charge of the bill, stated
Now we are dealing with an offense against interstate or international commerce, which the State cannot regulate by penal enactment, and we find the United States without any common law. The great thing that this bill does, except affording a remedy, is to extend the common-law principles, which protected fair competition in trade in old times in England, to international and interstate commerce in the United States.

Criticism 

Alan Greenspan, in his essay entitled Antitrust described the Sherman Act as stifling innovation and harming society. "No one will ever know what new products, processes, machines, and cost-saving mergers failed to come into existence, killed by the Sherman Act before they were born. No one can ever compute the price that all of us have paid for that Act which, by inducing less effective use of capital, has kept our standard of living lower than would otherwise have been possible." Greenspan summarized the nature of antitrust law as: "a jumble of economic irrationality and ignorance." Greenspan at that time was a disciple and friend of Ayn Rand, and he first published Antitrust in Rand's monthly publication The Objectivist Newsletter. Rand, who described herself as "a radical for capitalism", opposed antitrust law not only on economic grounds but also morally, as a violation of property rights, asserting that the "meaning and purpose" of antitrust law is "the penalizing of ability for being ability, the penalizing of success for being success, and the sacrifice of productive genius to the demands of envious mediocrity."

In 1890, Representative William E. Mason said "trusts have made products cheaper, have reduced prices; but if the price of oil, for instance, were reduced to one cent a barrel, it would not right the wrong done to people of this country by the trusts which have destroyed legitimate competition and driven honest men from legitimate business enterprise." Consequently, if the primary goal of the act is to protect consumers, and consumers are protected by lower prices, the act may be harmful if it reduces economy of scale, a price-lowering mechanism, by breaking up big businesses. Mason put small business survival, a justice interest, on a level concomitant with the pure economic rationale of consumer interest.

Economist Thomas DiLorenzo notes that Senator Sherman sponsored the 1890 William McKinley tariff just three months after the Sherman Act, and agrees with The New York Times which wrote on October 1, 1890: "That so-called Anti-Trust law was passed to deceive the people and to clear the way for the enactment of this Pro-Trust law relating to the tariff." The Times went on to assert that Sherman merely supported this "humbug" of a law "in order that party organs might say...'Behold! We have attacked the trusts. The Republican Party is the enemy of all such rings.'" Dilorenzo writes: "Protectionists did not want prices paid by consumers to fall. But they also understood that to gain political support for high tariffs they would have to assure the public that industries would not combine to increase prices to politically prohibitive levels. Support for both an antitrust law and tariff hikes would maintain high prices while avoiding the more obvious bilking of consumers."

Robert Bork was well known for his outspoken criticism of the antitrust regime. Another conservative legal scholar and judge, Richard Posner of the Seventh Circuit, does not condemn the entire regime, but expresses concern with the potential that it could be applied to create inefficiency, rather than to avoid inefficiency. Posner further believes, along with a number of others, including Bork, that genuinely inefficient cartels and coercive monopolies, the target of the act, would be self-corrected by market forces, making the strict penalties of antitrust legislation unnecessary. Conversely, liberal U.S. Supreme Court Justice William O. Douglas criticized the judiciary for interpreting and enforcing the antitrust law unequally: "From the beginning it [the Sherman Act] has been applied by judges hostile to its purposes, friendly to the empire builders who wanted it emasculated... trusts that were dissolved reintegrated in new forms... It is ironic that the Sherman Act was truly effective in only one respect, and that was when it was applied to labor unions.  Then the courts read it with a literalness that never appeared in their other decisions."

According to a 2018 study in the journal Public Choice, "Senator John Sherman of Ohio was motivated to introduce an antitrust bill in late 1889 partly as a way of enacting revenge on his political rival, General and former Governor Russell Alger of Michigan, because Sherman believed that Alger personally had cost him the presidential nomination at the 1888 Republican national convention... Sherman was able to pursue his revenge motive by combining it with the broader Republican goals of preserving high tariffs and attacking the trusts."

See also

 Alcoa
 American Bar Association
 American Tobacco Company
 Antitrust
 Bell System divestiture
 Cartel
 Clayton Antitrust Act of 1914
 DRAM price fixing
 George H. Earle, Jr.
 Plan of Bill Proposed by Hon. George H. Earle, Jr., Philadelphia. (1911) at Wikisource
 Federal Baseball Club v. National League
 Laissez-faire
 Lysine price-fixing conspiracy
 Monsanto Co. v. Spray-Rite Service Corp.
 National Linseed Oil Trust
 Northern Securities Company
 Price fixing
 Resale price maintenance
 Sarbanes–Oxley Act
 Standard Oil
 Standard Oil Co. of New Jersey v. United States
 Ticketmaster
 Tying (commerce)
 United States v. Microsoft

Notes and references

External links

 Sherman Act as amended (PDF/details) in the GPO Statute Compilations collection

 Official websites
 U.S. Department of Justice: Antitrust Division
 U.S. Department of Justice: Antitrust Division – text of SHERMAN ANTITRUST ACT, 15 U.S.C. §§ 1–7

Additional information
 Antitrust Division's "Corporate Leniency Policy"
 Antitrust by Alan Greenspan
 "Labor and the Sherman Act" (1940). Yale Law Journal 49(3) p. 518. .
 Dr. Edward W. Younkins (February 19, 2000). "Antitrust Laws Should Be Abolished".

United States federal antitrust legislation
United States federal criminal legislation
History of the petroleum industry in the United States
1890 in American law
Monopoly (economics)
1890 in American politics
Progressive Era in the United States